Vägen Framåt (Swedish: The Road Forward) was a weekly newspaper published by the New Swedish Movement, a fascist and corporatist nationalist political movement in Sweden founded by Per Engdahl. The paper was in circulation between 1932 and 1992 with some interruptions.

History and profile
Vägen Framåt was established as a weekly newspaper by the New Swedish Movement in Uppsala in 1932. The founding editor was Per Engdahl. The publisher was Riksförbundet Det nya Sverige based in Uppsala. Vägen Framåt was published in Stockholm in the period 1935-1937 and in Malmö from 1942.

Between 1937 and 1940 Vägen Framåt temporarily ceased publication. One of the editors was Yngve Nordberg, a friend of Per Engdahl. The paper frequently published articles by Per Engdahl who praised Adolf Hitler and Nazi Germany. One of his articles dated 1979 formulated the strategy to be followed by the Swedish fascist movement in future. The newspaper folded in 1992.

References

1932 establishments in Sweden
1992 disestablishments in Sweden
Antisemitic publications
Defunct newspapers published in Sweden
Defunct weekly newspapers
Fascist newspapers and magazines
Newspapers published in Stockholm
Mass media in Malmö
Mass media in Uppsala
Publications established in 1932
Publications disestablished in 1992
Swedish-language newspapers
Swedish nationalism
Weekly newspapers published in Sweden